The Pechora (Komi: Печӧра; Nenets: Санэроˮ яха) is the sixth-longest river in Europe. Flowing from Northwest Russia and into the Arctic Ocean, it lies mostly in the Komi Republic but the northernmost part crosses the Nenets Autonomous Okrug.

Geography

By mean annual discharge it ranks third in Europe, after the Volga and Danube. Its discharge is about half that of the Danube and a little more than its sister, the Northern Dvina, and is the largest of any river with no dams in its basin outside of New Guinea. 

West of its lower course is the Timan Ridge. East of the basin along the west flank of the Urals is the Yugyd Va National Park. Also in the basin is the Virgin Komi Forests, the largest virgin forest in Europe. In the far northeast of the basin on the Usa River is the large coal center of Vorkuta. The river was once an important transportation route, especially for those travelling to northwest Siberia. Today a railroad runs southwest from Vorkuta to Moscow.

Along the Pechora
The river rises in the Ural Mountains in the south-eastern corner of the Komi Republic. This area is part of the Pechora-Ilych Nature Reserve. On the other side of the Urals are the headwaters of the Northern Sosva. The river flows south, then west and turns north near Yaksha which is the head of navigation for small boats. A portage led south to the Kama basin. To the east is the upper Vychegda, a tributary of the Northern Dvina.  The river flows past Komsomolsk-na-Pechore to Ust-Ilych where the Ilych joins from the east, then Northwest to Troitsko-Pechorsk ( from the mouth), north to Vuktyl and Ust-Shchuger where the Shchugor joins from the east. The river then flows north to Pechora town, where the railway from Vorkuta crosses, then north to Ust-Usa where the Usa joins from the east (the Usa was once an important river route into Siberia). The Pechora then curves northwest, west, and west southwest. The Izhma joins from the south. It then flows further west to Ust-Tsilma ( from the mouth) where the Pizhma joins from the southwest and the Tsilma joins from the west. Before modern times people traveled up the Tsilma and portaged to the Pyoza to reach the White Sea. Then the Pechora turns north and crosses the arctic Arctic Circle and the border of the Nenets Okrug; Pustozyorsk; Naryan-Mar, the Nenets capital and a port at the head of the Pechora delta; Pechora Bay; Pechora Sea; and finally the Barents Sea.

Hydrology
The values are presented in the diagram below (metric units, m3/s).

Canal projects to the Kama River
Before the arrival of the railroad to the Pechora, an important way of travel to the region was via a portage road, from Cherdyn in the Kama basin to Yaksha on the Pechora.

A project for a Pechora–Kama Canal along the same general route was widely discussed in the 1960s through 1980s, this time not as much for transportation, but for the diversion of some of the water of the Pechora to the Kama, as part of a grand Northern river reversal scheme.

Literary reference
The Pechora was the source of the name of Pechorin – protagonist of the 1839 novel A Hero of Our Time by Mikhail Lermontov, a well-known work of Russian literature.

References
Pechora in the Great Soviet Encyclopedia

Rivers of the Komi Republic
Rivers of Nenets Autonomous Okrug